Ivan Mihov (Bulgarian: Иван Михов; born 8 June 1991) is a Bulgarian footballer who plays for Montana as a defender. He is the current captain of Montana.

References

External links

Bulgarian footballers
First Professional Football League (Bulgaria) players
OFC Pirin Blagoevgrad players
PFC Minyor Pernik players
FC Montana players
Association football defenders
1991 births
Living people
Sportspeople from Blagoevgrad